The 2014 ASP World Tour  was a professional surfing league competition run by the Association of Surfing Professionals. Men and women compete in separate tours with events taking place from late February to mid-December, at various surfing locations around the world.
Surfers receive points for their best events. The surfer with the most points at the end of the tour is announced the 2014 ASP Surfing World Champion.

2014 ASP World Championship Tour (WCT)

Men's Rankings

Points are awarded using the following structure:

Source

Women's Rankings

Source

References

External links
 Official Site

World Surf League
ASP World Tour